Coprinopsis psychromorbida or Cottony Snow Mold is a cause of snow mold. It is a basidiomycete, a psychrophile, and a plant pathogen.

Physiology 

Hosts 
Grows as a snow mold in wheat, rye, and other grasses (Poaceae) and can also cause storage rotting in apple and pear.

References 

Fungi described in 1981
Fungal plant pathogens and diseases
Wheat diseases
Rye diseases
Pear tree diseases
psychromorbida